Tokyo Brushstroke I and II, or Tokyo Brushstrokes, refers to two 1994 aluminum sculptures by Roy Lichtenstein. Copies are installed outside Shinjuku I-Land Co, Ltd., in Tokyo, Japan, and at the Parrish Art Museum in Watermill, New York.

See also

 1994 in art

References

1994 sculptures
Aluminium sculptures
Outdoor sculptures in Tokyo
Sculptures by Roy Lichtenstein